Zheng Meizhu (born November 5, 1962 in Fuzhou, Fujian) is a Chinese volleyball player who competed in the 1984 Summer Olympics and in the 1988 Summer Olympics.

In 1984, she was a member of the Chinese volleyball team which won the gold medal. She played all five matches.

Four years later, in 1988, she was part of the Chinese team which won the bronze medal. She played all five matches again.

Zheng was born in Fuzhou, Fujian Province. In 1975, she entered Fuzhou amateur sports school to play volleyball. In 1977, she became a member of provincial team. In 1979, she was summoned into Chinese national team twice. She was admitted into national team for third time in 1982.

From sports school, to provincial team, to national team, Zheng was always the youngest player. Doubts were also cast on her height (172 cm). After winning the Asian Tournament in 1979, Zheng didn't compete in World Cup in 1981, held in Japan.

In the end of 1991, Zheng went to Germany to play in a volleyball club. After retiring, she started doing business with her husband. She later became a manager in a Chinese medicinal rehabilitation facility near Munich. She is married and gave birth to two boys.

In 2008, Zheng came back to China and participated in Olympic torch relay in Fuzhou.

Awards

National team
 1982 World Championship -  Gold Medal
 1984 Los Angeles Olympic Games -  Gold Medal
 1985 World Cup -  Gold Medal
 1986 World Championship -  Gold Medal

External links
 Profile

1962 births
Living people
Olympic bronze medalists for China
Olympic gold medalists for China
Olympic volleyball players of China
Sportspeople from Fuzhou
Volleyball players at the 1984 Summer Olympics
Volleyball players at the 1988 Summer Olympics
Olympic medalists in volleyball
Sportspeople from Fujian
Asian Games medalists in volleyball
Volleyball players at the 1982 Asian Games
Volleyball players at the 1986 Asian Games
Medalists at the 1982 Asian Games
Medalists at the 1986 Asian Games
Asian Games gold medalists for China
Chinese women's volleyball players
Medalists at the 1988 Summer Olympics
Medalists at the 1984 Summer Olympics
Volleyball players from Fujian
20th-century Chinese women